Callichroma magnificum is a species of beetle in the family Cerambycidae. It was described by Napp and Martins in 2009. It is known from Colombia.

References

Callichromatini
Beetles described in 2009
Endemic fauna of Colombia